This is a list of Georgetown Hoyas football players in the NFL Draft.

Key

Selections

References

Lists of National Football League draftees by college football team

Georgetown Hoyas in the NFL Draft